Navod Paranavithana (born 16 May 2002) is a Sri Lankan cricketer. In January 2020, he was named in Sri Lanka's squad for the 2020 Under-19 Cricket World Cup. In March 2020, Paranavithana became the first batsman to score a quadruple century in a school match in Sri Lanka. He made his List A debut on 27 October 2021, for Tamil Union Cricket and Athletic Club in the 2021–22 Major Clubs Limited Over Tournament. He made his Twenty20 debut on 23 May 2022, for Tamil Union Cricket and Athletic Club in the Major Clubs T20 Tournament.

In July 2022, he was signed by the Colombo Stars for the third edition of the Lanka Premier League.

References

External links
 

2002 births
Living people
Sri Lankan cricketers
Tamil Union Cricket and Athletic Club cricketers
Cricketers from Galle